The Four Faces of Nuclear Terrorism is a 2004 book by Charles D. Ferguson and William C. Potter (with Amy Sands, Leonard S. Spector and Fred L. Wehling) which explores the motivations and capabilities of terrorist organizations to carry out significant attacks using stolen nuclear weapons, to construct and detonate crude nuclear weapons, to release radiation by attacking or sabotaging nuclear facilities, and to build and use radiological weapons or "dirty bombs." The authors argue that these "four faces" of nuclear terrorism are real threats which U.S. policy has failed to take into account. The book is the result of a two-year study by the Monterey Institute's Center for Nonproliferation Studies.

See also
 List of books about nuclear issues
 Nuclear Terrorism: The Ultimate Preventable Catastrophe
 On Nuclear Terrorism
 The Seventh Decade

References

2004 non-fiction books
American political books
Books about politics of the United States
Books about nuclear issues
Books about terrorism
Nuclear history of the United States
Nuclear terrorism